Tobermore is a townland lying within the civil parish of Kilcronaghan, County Londonderry, Northern Ireland. It lies in the north-east of the parish, and is bounded by the townlands of; Ballynahone Beg, Calmore, Clooney, Drumballyhagan Clark, Moneyshanere, and Moyesset. It was apportioned to the Drapers company as well as freeholds.

The townland was part of the Tobermore electoral ward of the former Magherafelt District Council, however in 1926 it was part of Tobermore district electoral division as part of the Maghera division of Magherafelt Rural District. It was also part of the historic barony of Loughinsholin.

History

The townland of Tobermore is named after an ancient well that was once sufficiently powerful to power a nearby mill, but has been dry for over a century. Fortwilliam rath and Fortwilliam House are both found in this townland. The townland of Tobermore along with four adjoining townlands formed the "Henry Estate". 

The town of Tobermore lies mostly in this townland, and partially in those of Calmore, Moneyshanere, and Moyesset.

See also
Kilcronaghan
List of townlands in Tobermore
Tobermore

References

Townlands of County Londonderry
Civil parish of Kilcronaghan